Cumberland is a residential neighbourhood in the Palisades area of north west Edmonton, Alberta, Canada.

The community is represented by the Cumberland-Oxford Community League, established in 2002.

Demographics 

According to the 2001 federal census, substantially all residential construction (98.6%) in Cumberland occurred during the 1990s.  Single-family dwellings account for approximately nine out of ten (91%) of the residences in the neighbourhood according to the 2005 municipal census.  The remaining one out of ten (9%) are row houses.  Nine out of ten residences (89%) are owner occupide with the remainder being rented.

The average household income in Cumberland is higher than the average household income in the City of Edmonton as a whole.

The neighbourhood is bounded on the east by 127 Street, on the west by 142 Street, on the north by 153 Avenue, and on the south by Cumberland Road (between 127 Street and 136 Street) and a line half a block north of 145 Avenue (between 136 Street and 142 Street).

Surrounding neighbourhoods

See also 
 Edmonton Federation of Community Leagues

References

External links 
 Cumberland Neighbourhood Profile

Neighbourhoods in Edmonton